Jordan Mark Edward James Shipley (born 26 September 1997) is a professional footballer who plays as a midfielder for League One club Shrewsbury Town. Born in England, he has played for the Republic of Ireland U21 national team.

Career
After coming through the youth system and making his debut in 2017, in August 2019 Shipley extended his contract with Coventry City until 2021.

On 11 May 2022, Shipley joined League One side Shrewsbury Town for an undisclosed fee, signing a three-year deal after Coventry had activated their option to extend his contract.

Career statistics

Honours
Coventry City
Checkatrade (Football League) Trophy winners 2017
EFL League Two play-offs: 2018
EFL League One: winners 2019/20

References

External links

1997 births
Living people
English footballers
Association football midfielders
Republic of Ireland association footballers
English Football League players
Coventry City F.C. players
Shrewsbury Town F.C. players